Combat Shock is the third studio album by Swamp Terrorists, released in 1993 by Alfa International and Contempo Records. A music video for "Pale Torment" was produced for four thousand dollars and televised by MTV Brasil and MTV Europe.

Reception
Aiding & Abetting gave Combat Shock a positive review, saying "it's catchy as hell, heavy enough to attract the headbanger and with good enough beats to work in a club." A critic for Keyboard concurred, saying "behind vocalist Ane H.'s snarling and gargling, STR kicks nasty but imaginative sequences" and that "power guitar samples dominate, but the occasional horn stab, light drum hit, or even shuffle beat adds an element of unpredictability to the din."

Track listing

Personnel
Adapted from the Combat Shock liner notes.

Swamp Terrorists
 Michael Antener (as STR) – programming
 Ane Hebeisen (as Ane H.) – lead vocals, photography

Production and design
 DJ Killroy – production, mixing
 Iron E. – production, mixing
 Stephan Rubli – typesetting
 Sandra S. – photography

Release history

References

External links 
 

1993 albums
Swamp Terrorists albums
Re-Constriction Records albums